The 1989 NCAA men's volleyball tournament was the 20th annual tournament to determine the national champion of NCAA men's collegiate volleyball. The tournament was played at Pauley Pavilion in Los Angeles, California during May 1989.

UCLA defeated Stanford in the final match, 3–1 (15–1, 15–13, 4–15, 15–12), to win their 13th national title. The Bruins (29–5) were coached by Al Scates.

UCLA's Matt Sonnichsen was named the tournament's Most Outstanding Player. Sonnichsen, along with five other players, also comprised the All-tournament team.

Qualification
Until the creation of the NCAA Men's Division III Volleyball Championship in 2012, there was only a single national championship for men's volleyball. As such, all NCAA men's volleyball programs, whether from Division I, Division II, or Division III, were eligible. A total of 4 teams were invited to contest this championship.

Tournament bracket 
Site: Pauley Pavilion, Los Angeles, California

All tournament team 
Matt Sonnichsen, UCLA (Most outstanding player)
Anthony Curci, UCLA
Trevor Schirman, UCLA
Matt Whitaker, UCLA
Scott Fortune, Stanford
Dan Hanan, Stanford
Chris Chase, Penn State

See also 
 NCAA Men's National Collegiate Volleyball Championship
 NCAA Women's Volleyball Championships (Division I, Division II, Division III)

References

1989
NCAA Men's Volleyball Championship
NCAA Men's Volleyball Championship
1989 in sports in California
Volleyball in California